Dijkot (Punjabi) is a city in the Faisalabad District of Punjab, Pakistan.

Demographics 
Dijkot has a population of 200,000

Geography 
The area of Dijkot is 700 kanal, or .35 km2. It is situated on the Sumandri road, 26 km from Faisalabad.

History

Dijkot was once named the “State of Dijkot.” The name "Dijkot" is derived from the word ‘ditch,’ which roughly translates to 'fort,' or 'city inside a fort'.

Dijkot is named after a warrior tribe. The city was destroyed in 326 BC, when it was attacked by the army of Alexander the Great and as a result, the population declined significantly.

The city was eventually re-inhabited and ruled by Chandragupta Maurya, who brought the town back to some significance. In 712 AD, Muhammad bin Qasim attacked Sindh, in southeast Pakistan. Qasim reached Chiniot, a city in Punjab, where he was subsequently arrested.

Dijkot was attacked in 1460 by local tribes and once again destroyed. It was rebuilt for second time by saint Baba Sher Shah, who lived south of the state. In 1908, a police station was established in Dijkot, along with a government high school during the British empire period in India.

Education
 Government Primary Schools
 Government Higher Secondary Schools (for males & females) 
 Government College for Boys
 Government Post Graduate College for Women

Health
 Civil Hospital, Dijkot

References

External links 

Cities and towns in Faisalabad District